O. S. Ambika  is an Indian politician from Kerala. She is currently serving as the MLA of Attingal constituency since May 2021.

References 

Kerala MLAs 2021–2026
Communist Party of India (Marxist) politicians from Kerala
Year of birth missing (living people)
Living people